Gerard Granollers and Pedro Martínez were the defending champions but only Martínez chose to defend his title, partnering Daniel Gimeno Traver. Martínez withdrew in the quarterfinals round.

David Vega Hernández and Mark Vervoort won the title after defeating Javier Barranco Cosano and Sergio Martos Gornés 6–3, 6–7(7–9), [10–7] in the final.

Seeds

Draw

References

External links
 Main draw

Copa Sevilla - Doubles
2021 Doubles